Maddison Keeney (born 23 May 1996) is an Australian diver. She won a bronze medal at the 2016 Summer Olympics in Rio de Janeiro, gold medals at the 2017 and 2019 World Aquatics Championships and 2022 Commonwealth Games, and silver medals at the 2014, 2018, and 2022 Commonwealth Games.

Career
Keeney rose to prominence in the Australian aquatic scene, when she competed at the 2014 Commonwealth Games in Glasgow, Scotland. There, she won the silver medal in the 1 m springboard event, a bronze in the 3 m synchronized springboard event with her partner Anabelle Smith and came 4th in the women's 3 metre springboard event.

At the 2015 World Aquatics Championships in Kazan, Russia, Keeney finished seventh in the 3 m springboard, fourth in mixed synchronised 3 m springboard, and twelfth in the 1 m springboard.

Keeney performed for the synchronized springboard diving, alongside Anabelle Smith, at the 2016 Summer Olympics in Rio de Janeiro. There, the pair opened with a back dive pike, scoring a score of 48.00 to share fifth place with Germany. On the third dive, they scored 72.20, slipping them to sixth place, within striking distance from bronze. They moved up one spot in the standings to fifth on 228.09 in the penultimate round, before snatching bronze in their final dive.

At the 2017 World Aquatics Championships in Budapest, Hungary, Keeney won gold in the 1m springboard.

She competed at the 2018 Commonwealth Games where she won a silver medal in the women's 3 metre springboard event and came 7th in the women's synchronised 3 metre springboard event.

For the 2022 Commonwealth Games, contested in Birmingham, England, Keeney won a gold medal in the 3 metre synchronized springboard, scoring less than 20 points ahead of silver medalists Nur Dhabitah Sabri and Ng Yan Yee of Malaysia with a final mark of 316.53 points achieved with her partner Anabelle Smith. The following day, she won the gold medal in the 3 metre springboard, scoring 348.95 points in the final round of competition. One day later, she scored 304.02 points with partner Li Shixin in the mixed 3 metre synchronised springboard to win the silver medal.

References

External links
 
 
 
 

1996 births
20th-century Australian women
21st-century Australian women
Australian female divers
Commonwealth Games bronze medallists for Australia
Commonwealth Games gold medallists for Australia
Commonwealth Games silver medallists for Australia
Commonwealth Games medallists in diving
Divers at the 2014 Commonwealth Games
Divers at the 2016 Summer Olympics
Divers at the 2018 Commonwealth Games
Divers at the 2022 Commonwealth Games
Living people
Medalists at the 2016 Summer Olympics
Olympic bronze medalists for Australia
Olympic divers of Australia
Olympic medalists in diving
Sportspeople from Auckland
Sportspeople from Brisbane
University of Queensland alumni
World Aquatics Championships medalists in diving
Medallists at the 2014 Commonwealth Games
Medallists at the 2018 Commonwealth Games
Medallists at the 2022 Commonwealth Games